Henry Kendall Ltd v William Lillico Ltd [1969] 2 AC 31 is an English contract law case concerning the incorporation of contract terms through a course of dealings.

Facts
Animal food was sold by merchants to a farmer. It was defective. The merchants brought in suppliers, and they in turn brought in their suppliers, a long chain. (hence also Hardwick Game v Suffolk Agricultural Poultry Producers Association). Purchases three or four times a month had happened for three or so years, and each time, a sold note followed, which said the buyer took responsibility for any latent defects. The buyers had never read the note.

Judgment
The House of Lords held that a reasonable seller in the circumstances would have had good cause to assume that the buyer agreed to the term, hence rejecting Lord Devlin’s McCutcheon dicta that previous dealings needed to prove actual knowledge.

See also

English contract law

Notes

References

English incorporation case law
1969 in case law
1969 in British law
House of Lords cases